Edgar Jean Faure (18 August 1908 – 30 March 1988) was a French politician, lawyer, essayist, historian and memoirist who served as Prime Minister of France in 1952 and again between 1955 and 1956. Prior to his election to the National Assembly for Jura under the Fourth Republic in 1946, he was a member of the French Committee of National Liberation (CFLN) in Algiers (1943–1944). A Radical, Faure was married to writer Lucie Meyer. In 1978, he was elected to the Académie Française.

Life
Faure was born in Béziers, Hérault, to a French Army doctor. He was nearsighted yet a brilliant student since his youth, earning a baccalauréat at 15, as well as a law degree at 19 in Paris. At 21 years of age he became a member of the bar association, the youngest lawyer in France to do so at the time. While living in Paris, he became active in Third Republic politics; he joined the Radical Party in 1929.

During the German occupation of World War II, he joined the French Resistance in the Maquis. In 1942, he fled to Charles de Gaulle's headquarters in Algiers, where he was made head of the Provisional Government of the Republic's legislative department. At the end of the war, he served as French counsel for the prosecution at the Nuremberg Trials.

In 1946, he was elected to the French Parliament as a Radical. While the popularity of his party declined to less than 10% of the total vote, none of the other parties was able to gain a clear majority. Therefore, early on, his party often played a disproportionately important role in the formation of governments. He thus led the cabinet in 1952 and from 1955 to 1956. Faure was a leader of the more conservative wing of the party, opposing the party's left, under Pierre Mendès France.

Faure's views changed during the Fourth Republic; after initial opposition to the Fifth Republic (he voted against presidential election by universal suffrage in the 1962 referendum), he eventually became a Gaullist. The Gaullist Party, the Union for the New Republic, sent him on an unofficial mission to the People's Republic of China in 1963. In government he served in successive ministries: Agriculture (1966–1968), National Education (1968–1969, where he was responsible for pushing through reform of the universities) and Social Affairs (1972–1973). He declined to be a candidate at the 1974 presidential election, in which he supported Valéry Giscard d'Estaing against the Gaullist candidate, Jacques Chaban-Delmas.

He had the reputation of a careerist and the nickname of "weathercock". He replied with humour, "it is not the weathercock which turns; it is the wind!"

He was a member of the National Assembly for the Jura department from 1946 to 1958, as well as for the Doubs department from 1967 to 1980. He presided over the National Assembly from 1973 to 1978. He sought another term as President of the Assembly President in 1978 but was defeated by Chaban-Delmas. Faure was a Senator from 1959 to 1967 for Jura and again, in 1980, for Doubs. In 1978, he became a member of the Académie Française.

On the regional, departmental and local levels, Edgar Faure was Mayor of Port-Lesney, Jura from 1947 to 1971 and again from 1983 to 1988, as well as Mayor of Pontarlier between 1971 and 1977; he served as President of the General Council of the Jura department from 1949 to 1967, then member of the General Council of the Doubs from 1967 to 1979, President of the Regional Council of Franche-Comté (1974–1981, 1982–1988). He played a key role during the creation and first years of the Assembly of European Regions (AER), becoming his first president in 1985 and staying in that position until 1988.

He was buried at the Cimetière de Passy, Paris, where his wife Lucie Meyer was buried following her death in 1977.

Personal life

In 1931, Faure married writer Lucie Meyer, a daughter of a silk merchant. They spent their one-month-long honeymoon in the Soviet Union.

Political career
Governmental functions
President of the Council (Prime Minister): January–February 1952 / February–December 1955
Secretary of State for Finance: 1949–1950
Minister of the Budget: 1950–1951
Minister of Justice: 1951–1952
Minister of Finance and Economic Affairs: 1953–1955
Minister of Foreign Affairs: January–February 1955
Minister of Finance, Economic Affairs and Planning: May–June 1958
Minister of Agriculture: 1966–1968
Minister of National Education: 1968–1969
Minister of State, Minister of Social Affairs: 1972–1973

Electoral mandates
President of the National Assembly of France: 1973–1978
Member of the National Assembly of France for Doubs: Elected in 1967, 1968, but remains a cabinet member / 1973–1980
Member of the National Assembly of France for Jura: 1946–1958
Senator for Jura: 1959–1966 (became a cabinet member in 1966)
Senator for Doubs: 1980–1988 (died in 1988)
President of the Regional Council of Franche-Comté: 1974–1981 / 1982–1988 (died in 1988)
Mayor of Port-Lesney: 1947–1970 / 1983–1988 (died in 1988)
Mayor of Pontarlier: 1971–1977
President of the General Council of Jura: 1949–1967
General councillor of Jura: 1967–1979

Bibliography
He published the following books:
Le serpent et la tortue (les problèmes de la Chine populaire), Juillard, 1957
La disgrâce de Turgot, Gallimard, 1961
La capitation de Dioclétien, Sirey 1961
Prévoir le présent, Gallimard, 1966
L'éducation nationale et la participation, Plon, 1968
Philosophie d'une réforme, Plon, 1969
L'âme du combat, Fayard, 1969
Ce que je crois, Grasset, 1971
Pour un nouveau contrat social, Seuil, 1973
Au-delà du dialogue avec Philippe Sollers, Balland, 1977
La banqueroute de Law, Gallimard, 1977
La philosophie de Karl Popper et la société politique d'ouverture, Firmin Didot, 1981
Pascal: le procès des provinciales, Firmin Didot, 1930
Le pétrole dans la paix et dans la guerre, Nouvelle revue critique 1938
Mémoires I, "Avoir toujours raison, c'est un grand tort", Plon, 1982
Mémoires II, "Si tel doit être mon destin ce soir", Plon, 1984
Discours prononcé pour la réception de Senghor à l'Académie française, le 29 mars 1984

Governments

First ministry (20 January – 8 March 1952)
Edgar Faure – President of the Council and Minister of Finance
Georges Bidault – Vice President of the Council and Minister of National Defense
Henri Queuille – Vice President of the Council
Robert Schuman – Minister of Foreign Affairs
Pierre Pflimlin – Minister for the Council of Europe
Maurice Bourgès-Maunoury – Minister of Armaments
Charles Brune – Minister of the Interior
Robert Buron – Minister of Economic Affairs and Information
Pierre Courant – Minister of Budget
Jean-Marie Louvel – Minister of Industry and Energy
Paul Bacon – Minister of Labour and Social Security
Léon Martinaud-Deplat – Minister of Justice
André Morice – Minister of Merchant Marine
Pierre-Olivier Lapie – Minister of National Education
Emmanuel Temple – Minister of Veterans and War Victims
Camille Laurens – Minister of Agriculture
Louis Jacquinot – Minister of Overseas France
Antoine Pinay – Minister of Public Works, Transport, and Tourism
Paul Ribeyre – Minister of Public Health and Population
Eugène Claudius-Petit – Minister of Reconstruction and Town Planning
Roger Duchet – Minister of Posts, Telegraphs, and Telephones
Édouard Bonnefous – Minister of Commerce
Jean Letourneau – Minister of Partner States
Joseph Laniel – Minister of State
François Mitterrand – Minister of State

Second ministry (23 February 1955 – 1 February 1956)
Edgar Faure – President of the Council
Antoine Pinay – Minister of Foreign Affairs
Pierre Koenig – Minister of National Defense and Armed Forces
Maurice Bourgès-Maunoury – Minister of the Interior
Pierre Pflimlin – Minister of Finance and Economic Affairs
André Morice – Minister of Commerce and Industry
Paul Bacon – Minister of Labour and Social Security
Robert Schuman – Minister of Justice
Paul Antier – Minister of Merchant Marine
Jean Berthoin – Minister of National Education
Raymond Triboulet – Minister of Veterans and War Victims
Jean Sourbet – Minister of Agriculture
Pierre-Henri Teitgen – Minister of Overseas France
Édouard Corniglion-Molinier – Minister of Public Works, Transport, and Tourism
Bernard Lafay – Minister of Public Health and Population
Roger Duchet – Minister of Reconstruction and Housing
Édouard Bonnefous – Minister of Posts
Pierre July – Minister of Moroccan and Tunisian Affairs

Changes
6 October 1955 – Pierre Billotte succeeds Koenig as Minister of National Defense and Armed Forces. Vincent Badie succeeds Triboulet as Minister of Veterans and War Victims.
20 October 1955 – Pierre July leaves the Cabinet and the office of Minister of Moroccan and Tunisian Affairs is abolished.
1 December 1955 – Edgar Faure succeeds Bourgès-Maunoury as interim Minister of the Interior.

References

1908 births
1988 deaths
People from Béziers
Politicians from Occitania (administrative region)
Republican-Socialist Party politicians
Radical Party (France) politicians
Rally of Left Republicans politicians
Union of Democrats for the Republic politicians
Rally for the Republic politicians
Prime Ministers of France
French Foreign Ministers
French Ministers of Budget
French Ministers of Justice
French interior ministers
French Ministers of National Education
French Ministers of Finance
French Ministers of Agriculture
Presidents of the National Assembly (France)
Deputies of the 1st National Assembly of the French Fourth Republic
Deputies of the 2nd National Assembly of the French Fourth Republic
Deputies of the 3rd National Assembly of the French Fourth Republic
Deputies of the 3rd National Assembly of the French Fifth Republic
Deputies of the 4th National Assembly of the French Fifth Republic
Deputies of the 5th National Assembly of the French Fifth Republic
Deputies of the 6th National Assembly of the French Fifth Republic
French Senators of the Fifth Republic
Senators of Jura (department)
Senators of Doubs
French memoirists
20th-century French lawyers
French male essayists
20th-century French historians
20th-century French essayists
20th-century French male writers
French Resistance members
French people of the Algerian War
Members of the Académie Française
Burials at Passy Cemetery
20th-century memoirists
Member of the Academy of the Kingdom of Morocco